Nu-Flow is the debut studio album by British R&B/hip hop group Big Brovaz, originally released on 4 November 2002. The album features five singles, of which four were UK top-10 singles—the title track "Nu Flow", which was a hit across Europe; "OK"; "Favourite Things" (the highest charting hit from the album) and "Baby Boy". The fifth single from the album was "Ain't What You Do", which peaked at number 15. The album peaked at number 6 on the UK Albums Chart and has been certified double platinum by the BPI.

Track listing
Version 1:
"Nu Flow"
"Find a Way"
"Taking It Global"
"Summertime"
"Gotta Get"
"OK" (full version)
"Little Mama"
"Don't Watch That"
"Baby Boy"
"Don't Matter"
"I Know You're There"

Version 2:
"Nu Flow"
"Gotta Get"
"Don't Matter"
"Baby Boy"
"Ain't What You Do"
"OK" (radio edit)
"I Know You're There"
"Taking It Global"
"Summertime"
"Find a Way"
"Little Mamma"
"This Music"
"Don't Watch That"
"OK" (Rock Remix)

Bonus videos:
"Nu Flow"
"OK"

Version 3:
"Nu Flow"
"Gotta Get"
"Don't Matter"
"Baby Boy"
"Favourite Things"
"OK" (radio edit)
"I Know You're There"
"Taking It Global"
"Summertime"
"Find a Way"
"Little Mamma"
"This Music"
"Ain't What You Do"
"Don't Watch That"
"OK" (rock remix)
"My Favourite Things" (hidden track)

Bonus videos:
"Nu Flow"
"OK"

Version 4: Australian Limited Edition with bonus DVD
"Nu Flow"
"Gotta Get"
"Don't Matter"
"Baby Boy"
"Favourite Things"
"OK" (radio edit)
"I Know You're There"
"Taking It Global"
"Summertime"
"Find a Way"
"Little Mamma"
"This Music"
"Ain't What You Do"
"Don't Watch That"
"We Wanna Thank You"

Bonus DVD:
"Nu Flow"
"Favourite Things"
"OK"
"Baby Boy"
"Ain't What You Do"

Charts

Weekly charts

Year-end charts

Certifications

References

2002 debut albums
2003 albums
Big Brovaz albums
Epic Records albums